Herbal Tonic is a 2010 compilation album by British rap duo the Herbaliser. It was released by the Ninja Tune label on 14 June 2010. It consists of songs from the group's previously released albums on Ninja Tune, which were released between 1995 and 2010.

Critical reception

Most critics gave Herbal Tonic favorable reviews; for example, Andy Fyfe of BBC Music described it as "as good a soundtrack to the last decade and a half as anyone can muster."

Track listing
	Gadget Funk	
	Nah' Mean Nah'm Sayin' (Featuring Jean Grae)
	The Missing Suitcase	
	The Blend (Featuring Jean Grae)
	Starlight (Featuring Roots Manuva)
	Song For Mary	
	Mr Chombee Has The Flaw (From Session 2)	
	Something Wicked	
	Mrs Chombee Takes The Plunge (Remixed by DJ Food)
	The Sensual Woman	
	It Ain't Nuttin' (Featuring MF Doom)
       8pt Agenda
	Tea & Beer (Featuring Jean Grae)
	Ginger Jumps The Fence (From Session 1)	
	March Of The Dead Things (Unreleased)	
	Stranded On Earth

Personnel
The Herbaliser

Featured artists
Jessica Darling
Jean Grae	
Latyrx	
MF Doom
Roots Manuva
Seaming To

Production and arrangements
Chris Bowden – string arrangements
Easy Access Orchestra – horn arrangements, horn engineer, producer
Ollie Teeba – producer
Jake Wherry – producer

References 

The Herbaliser albums
2010 compilation albums
Ninja Tune compilation albums
Hip hop compilation albums